The Canjuers Lagerstätte is a Konservat-Lagerstätte located inside the military camp of Canjuers, in Haute Provence, in the Var department in South-East France.

Geology and stratigraphy

From a stratigraphic point of view, this fossil deposit is located inside the Calcaires blancs de Provence geological formation, a 200-meter-thick limestone assemblage. The lithographic limestone of Canjuers, which bears almost all significant fossils from the Lagerstätte, is a thin layer (around 6 meters) at the basis of the Biomicrites de Sainte-Croix member, the later member of the Calcaires blancs de Provence. This layer has been dated by ammonite analysis to the Lower Tithonian (Neochetoceras mucronatum biozone), around 150 Mya.

The Canjuers site facies outcrop in the Petit Plan de Canjuers plateau, and a quarry was exploited in the locality "Les Bessons". They correspond to deposits inside a sub-circular depression whose area is estimated to be only 1 km2. Their total thickness is around 12 m. They are divided in three lithologic units, from bottom to top :
 The lithographic limestone per se, made of thin limestone, finely laminated, around 6 m thick. Those bears almost every remarkable fossils from the site (Lagerstätte).
 Bioclastic limestone 4.5 m thick. Those are packstone or grainstone limestone, with chert nodule levels. Their bioclasts are made of corals, sea urchins, bivalves, brachiopods and sponges fragments, with burrows and some plant remains. The banks show quasi-planar oblique surface. 
 The sub-lithographic limestone with chert nodule levels, 1.5 m wide, in thick banks perforated by burrows attributed to the ichnotaxon Tubularina lithographica.

Paleoenvironment

The lithographic limestone deposit environment was protected from the Tethys Ocean open sea by a continuous reef barrier. The lithographic limestone was deposited in a large lagoon whose various parts were successively above and below water, and where several small coral islands emerged. Meteoric water supplies are likely.

Paleontology

Actinopterygians

Sarcopterygians

Chondrichthyans

Reptiles

Echinoderms

Brachiopods

Molluscs

Crustaceans

References

Geologic formations of France
Jurassic System of Europe
Jurassic France
Tithonian
Fossiliferous stratigraphic units of Europe
Paleontology in France
Var (department)
Lagoonal deposits
Limestone formations